Events in the year 1844 in Belgium.

Incumbents
Monarch: Leopold I
Prime Minister: Jean-Baptiste Nothomb

Events
 1 January
Royal decree establishes spelling rules for Dutch in Belgium.
Vlaemsch België, first Dutch-language daily newspaper in Belgium, launched.
 6 February – Conseil héraldique de Belgique established
 27 May – Provicial elections
 19 October – Postal convention between Britain and Belgium signed in London.

undated
 Belgian Pontifical College established

Publications
Periodicals
 Annales de la Société royale des beaux-arts et de littérature de Gand
 Annuaire de l'Académie royale des sciences et belles-lettres de Bruxelles, 10
 Annuaire de l'état militaire de Belgique
 Gazette médicale belge
 Messager des sciences historiques
 Nouvelle Revue de Bruxelles
La renaissance: Chronique des arts et de la littérature, 5.

Official publications
 Convention de limites entre la Belgique et les Pays-Bas, conclue à Maestricht le 8 aout 1843 (Brussels, Imprimerie du Moniteur Belge, 1844)
 État de l'instruction supérieure en Belgique (Brussels, M. Devroye)
 Pasicrisie belge: recueil général de la jurisprudence des cours (Brussels, Société Typographique Belge)

Others
 Auguste Baron, La Belgique monumentale, historique et pittoresque (Brussels, A. Jamar & Ch. Hen)
 Pierre de Decker, Études historiques et critiques sur les monts-de-piété en Belgique (Brussels, Société des Beaux-Arts)
 Laurent-Guillaume de Koninck, Description des animaux fossiles qui se trouvent dans le terrain carbonifère de Belgique (Liège, H. Dessain)
 Jules de Saint-Genois, Anna: historisch tafereel uit de Vlaemsche geschiedenis tydens Maria van Bourgonje
 Jean-Joseph Thonissen, Constitution belge annotée (Hasselt, P.-F. Milis)
 Alphonse Wauters, Les délices de la Belgique (Brussels, Société des Beaux-Arts)

Births
 24 March – Camille Lemonnier, writer (died 1913)
 10 April – Jules de Burlet, politician (died 1897)
 27 April – Théophile Wahis, colonial governor (died 1921)
 3 June – Paul Mansion, mathematician (died 1919)
 21 November – Jenny Minne-Dansaert, lacemaker (died 1909)
 16 December – Victor Chauvin, Orientalist (died 1913)

Deaths
 13 April – Frédéric Théodore Faber (born 1782), painter
 14 October – Jan Baptiste de Jonghe (born 1785), painter

References

 
1840s in Belgium